"Ultraleicht" is a song by German recording artist Andreas Bourani. It was written by Bourani along with Julius Hartog and Jasmin Shakeri for his second album Hey (2014), while production was helmed by Peter "Jem" Seifert.

Formats and track listings

Charts

Weekly charts

References

2015 singles
Andreas Bourani songs
2014 songs
Universal Music Group singles
Songs written by Andreas Bourani